Campen Lighthouse is an active lighthouse in the village of Campen, by the Ems estuary, northwest of Emden, in the East Frisia region, state of Lower Saxony, Germany. At a height of  it is the fourteenth tallest "traditional lighthouse" in the world and the tallest in Germany.

The structure consists of a free-standing lattice tower with the stair shaft inside. The lighthouse was built in 1889 and went in service on 1 October 1891.

The lamp of Campen Lighthouse has a light intensity of 4.5 million candelas, the most powerful lighthouse lamp in Germany.
Remarkably, the aperture of its flashing light to the left and right has an angle of only 0.3 degrees. The continuous light aperture is also quite small, less than 0.6 degrees.

The machine building contains the oldest workable diesel engine in Germany. It was built in 1906 and has a power of 15 kilowatts.

See also 

 List of tallest lighthouses in the world
 List of lighthouses and lightvessels in Germany

References

External links 

 

Lighthouses completed in 1889
Lighthouses in Lower Saxony